Capital punishment in Saudi Arabia is a legal penalty. Death sentences are almost exclusively based on the system of judicial sentencing discretion (tazir), following the classical principle of avoiding Sharia-prescribed (hudud) penalties when possible. In recent decades, the government and the courts have increasingly issued these sentences, reacting to a rise in violent crime during the 1970s. This paralleled similar developments in the U.S. and Mainland China in the late 20th century.

The kingdom executed at least 158 people in 2015, at least 154 in 2016, at least 146 in 2017, 149 in 2018, 184 in 2019, 69 in 2020, and at least 116 in 2022. The drastic reduction in 2020 was due to a moratorium on death penalties for drug-related offenses as Saudi Arabia proposed ending the death penalty for these and other nonviolent offences. Additionally, on 26 April 2020, a royal decree ended the execution of people who were juveniles when they committed their crime. (Saudi Arabia had previously executed these people despite having signed the Convention on the Rights of the Child.) Nonetheless, there were 67 executions in 2021, more than doubling the previous year's, according to the European Saudi Organisation for Human Rights. In January 2022, at least 43 detainees, including 12 minors, were threatened with execution. On March 12, 2022, Saudi Arabia executed 81 people, seven of whom were Yemenis and one of whom was a Syrian, in the largest known mass execution in the history of the country.

Method
Saudi Arabia has a criminal justice system based on a form of Shari'ah reflecting a particular state-sanctioned interpretation of Islam.

Execution is usually carried out by beheading with a sword and hanging but may occasionally be performed by shooting or firing squad. Saudi Arabia performs public executions. Sentences are primarily given on confession. Human Rights Watch says the majority of people are tortured to obtain confession and courts have not investigated it. As of April 2020, minors who commit crimes will no longer face execution when they turn 18, and would instead face a maximum of 10 years in juvenile detention facility.

A 2018 report by the European Saudi Organization for Human Rights (ESOHR) asserts that the number of beheadings in the kingdom during the first quarter of 2018 rose by over 70 percent compared to the same period in 2017.

A public beheading will typically take place around 9 a.m. The convicted person is walked to a courtyard near the courthouse and kneels in front of the executioner. A police official announces the crimes committed by the person and the beheading takes place. The executioner uses a sword known as a sulthan to remove the condemned person's head from his or her body at the neck. After a medical examiner inspects the body and then pronounces the convict dead, a police official announces the crimes committed by the beheaded convict once again and the process is complete. Professional executioners have beheaded as many as 10 people in a single day.

Crucifixion of the beheaded body is sometimes ordered in cases where the person was a child molester or a rapist. For example, in 2009, the Saudi Gazette reported that "an Abha court had sentenced the leader of an armed gang to death and three-day crucifixion (public displaying of the beheaded body) and six other gang members to beheading for their role in jewelry store robberies in Asir." (This practice resembles gibbeting, in which the entire body is displayed.)

In 2003, Muhammad Saad al-Beshi, whom the BBC described as "Saudi Arabia's leading executioner", gave a rare interview to Arab News. He described his first execution in 1998: "The criminal was tied and blindfolded. With one stroke of the sword I severed his head. It rolled metres away... People are amazed how fast [the sword] can separate the head from the body." He also said that, before an execution, he visits the victim's family to seek forgiveness for the criminal, which can lead to the criminal's life being spared. Once an execution goes ahead, his only conversation with the prisoner is to tell him or her to recite the Muslim declaration of belief, the Shahada. "When they get to the execution area, their strength drains away. Then I read the execution order, and at a signal I cut the prisoner's head off," he said.

Capital offences

Saudi law theoretically allows the death penalty for a variety of crimes:

 Apostasy
 Treason
 Homosexuality
 Espionage
 Murder
 Rape
 Terrorism
 Drug smuggling
 Armed robbery
 Blasphemy
 Burglary if aggravated circumstances, including recidivism
 Adultery (unmarried adulterers can be sentenced to 100 lashes, married ones can be sentenced to stoning.) 
 Sorcery or witchcraft
 Waging war on God

Murder
Murder is punishable by death in Saudi Arabia. If a murderer pays a family of the victim blood money, and the family approves of the choice, the murderer will not be executed. The criminal justice system waits until the family makes a decision on whether the family of the victim will accept blood money or if the family of the victim will choose to have the murderer executed, or to completely forgive the perpetrator.

Other offences

Sharia background
The Saudi judiciary can impose the death penalty according to three categories of criminal offence in Sharia law:

Hudud: Fixed punishments for specific crimes. Hudud crimes which can result in the death penalty include apostasy, adultery, and sodomy although requirement of evidence is high and is usually based on confession. Punishment for adultery and sodomy is stoning. No stoning has taken place in Saudi Arabia in the last decades.
Qisas: Eye-for-an-eye retaliatory punishments. Qisas crimes include murder. Families of someone murdered can choose between demanding the death penalty or granting clemency in return for a payment of diyya, or blood money, by the perpetrator. The amount of blood-money requested can be quite considerable: a recent report mentions a sum of $11 million demanded in exchange for clemency.
Tazir: A general category, including crimes defined by national regulations, some of which can be punished by death, such as drug trafficking.

A conviction requires proof in one of three ways:

 An uncoerced confession.
 The testimony of two male witnesses can result in conviction. This excludes "hudud crimes", in which case a confession is also required.
 An affirmation or denial by oath can be required.

Giving an oath is taken particularly seriously in a religious society such as Saudi Arabia's, and a refusal to take an oath will be taken as an admission of guilt resulting in conviction.

Adultery
In order for an individual to be convicted in a Saudi sharia law court of adultery, he/she must confess to the act four times in front of the court; otherwise four pious male Muslims or two pious men and two women who witnessed the actual sexual penetration must testify in front of the court. If the witnesses were spying on the defendants or intentionally watched the defendants commit adultery, their uprightness would be called into question and a conviction for adultery would not take place. According to the Islamic sharia law, the burden of proof is on the accuser; and if only one of those witnesses retracted his/her testimony then the accused will be acquitted and the remaining witnesses will be prosecuted for perjury Quran 24:4.

The execution method for adultery committed by married men and women is stoning (see Capital offences). If the conviction was established through confession, a retraction of the confession or the defendant leaving the pit while stoning is taking place results in the penalty being stayed. If the conviction was established through the testimony of four witnesses, the witnesses must initiate the stoning, and failure to do so results in the execution being stayed. Sandra Mackey, author of The Saudis: Inside the Desert Kingdom, stated in 1987 that in Saudi Arabia, "unlike the tribal rights of a father to put to death a daughter who has violated her chastity, death sentences under Qur'anic law [for adultery] are extremely rare." Mackey explained that "[c]harges of adultery are never made lightly. Since the penalty is so severe, women are protected from unfounded accusations of sexual misconduct". During a human rights dialogue with European jurists that took place several years before 1987, a Saudi delegate acknowledged that it is difficult to have a person convicted of adultery. According to Mackey, in a 20-year period ending in 1987, one woman "is acknowledged to" have been executed by stoning for adultery.

Princess Misha'al was shot several times in the head for adultery in 1977; investigation revealed she never faced a trial and was executed extrajudicially; scholars have termed her execution as honor killing.

Witchcraft
Muree bin Ali bin Issa al-Asiri, who was found in possession of talismans, was executed in the southern Najran province in June 2012. A Saudi woman, Amina bin Salem Nasser, was executed for being convicted of practising sorcery and witchcraft in December 2011 in Al Jawf Region, and a Sudanese man (Abdul Hamid Bin Hussain Bin Moustafa al-Fakki) was executed in a car park in Medina for the same reason on 20 September 2011. In 2014, Mohammed bin Bakr al-Alawi was beheaded on 5 August for allegedly practicing black magic and sorcery.

Mass executions

2016 
On 2 January 2016, the Kingdom of Saudi Arabia carried out a mass execution of 47 imprisoned civilians convicted for terrorism in 12 different provinces. Forty-three were beheaded and four were executed by firing squads. Among the 47 people killed was Shia Sheikh Nimr al-Nimr. The execution was the largest carried out in the kingdom since 1980.   These executions were the first to be carried out in 2016, with rights groups claiming that Saudi Arabia had executed at least 157 people in the year prior. In 2015, it was said that this year holds the greatest number of executions since 1995.

2019 
On 23 April 2019, the Saudi Interior Ministry stated that the Kingdom carried out a mass execution of 37 imprisoned civilians who had been convicted, mostly on the basis of confessions obtained under torture or written by the accused's torturers, for terrorism-related allegations in 6 provinces in the country. Fourteen of the people executed had been convicted in relation to their participation in the 2011–12 Saudi Arabian protests in Qatif, mostly on the basis of torture-induced confessions. The executions were carried out by beheading, and two of the bodies were publicly hung from a pole. According to Saudi Arabia's Interior Ministry the convicts were all Saudi nationals. Thirty two of those executed belonged to the country's Shia minority. One of the thirty-two, Abdul Kareem Al Hawaj, was 16 years old at the time of his alleged crime; executions for crimes committed by those under 18 are violations of international law. According to Reprieve, two others were also under 18 at the time of their alleged crimes, Mujtaba al-Sweikat and Salman Qureish. The bodies of at least 33 out of these 37 people executed were not handed back to their respective families. The Saudi government did not publicly explain why, and had not handed back the corpses of those executed as of 8 April 2020. It is thought that they fear it would lead to protest by their Shia minority.

2022 
In March 2022, Saudi Arabia executed 81 people, transcending the 67 people executed in 2021. The men executed which included 37 Saudi nationals, some Yemenis and Syrians, were allegedly convicted of several criminal offenses such as the murder of innocent men, women, and children, as per the official statement issued. Rights groups accused the government of imposing restrictive laws against religious expression and political views and criticized its use of the death penalty, including those arrested as minors, and cited the execution as a violation of human rights. However, the government of Saudi Arabia denied the accusations of human rights abuse and claimed that the said laws were imposed to protect its national security.

Criticism
The use of public beheading as the method of capital punishment and the number of executions have attracted strong international criticism. Several executions, particularly of foreign workers, have sparked international outcries.

In June 2011, Ruyati binti Satubi, an Indonesian maid, was beheaded for killing her employer's wife, reportedly after years of abuse. Her execution drew extensive criticism from Indonesian press, government and human rights groups.

In September 2011, a Sudanese migrant worker was beheaded for sorcery, an execution which Amnesty International condemned as "appalling". Amnesty International said that Saudi Arabia doesn't have a formal law on Sorcery but some conservative clerics call for strictest punishment possible.

In January 2013, a Sri Lankan maid named Rizana Nafeek was beheaded after she was convicted of murdering a child under her care, an event which she attributed to the infant's choking. The execution drew international condemnation of the government's practices, and led Sri Lanka to recall its ambassador.

These are not isolated cases. According to figures by Amnesty International, in 2010 at least 27 migrant workers were executed and, as of January 2013, more than 45 foreign maids were on death row awaiting execution.

In practice, capital punishment has also been used to sentence political protesters. Ali al-Nimr and Dawoud al-Marhoon were both arrested at the age of 17 in 2012 during Arab Spring protests in the Eastern Province, tortured, forced to confess, and sentenced to decapitation in 2014 and 2015. Sheikh Nimr al Nimr, an independent sheikh critical of the Saudi government and popular among youth and Ali al Nimr's uncle, was also arrested in 2012 and sentenced to death by the Specialized Criminal Court in 2014 for his role in encouraging political protests. Nimr al Nimr was executed on 2 January 2016, along with 46 other people, mostly terrorists arrested in the 2000s. From the available sources about the Nimr al-Nimr case it seems that Saudi officials use the term "terrorism" as cover label for "thought crimes" which in other countries would be considered normal work of an opposition politician.

On 20 October 2020, Human Rights Watch revealed that Saudi authorities were seeking the death penalty against eight men from Saudi Arabia who were charged with protest-related crimes. Some of the alleged crimes were committed when they were children, between the ages of 14 and 17. One of them, charged for a non-violent crime, allegedly committed it at the age of 9. All men who were at risk of capital punishment were in pretrial detention for nearly two years.

In March 2021, Human Rights Watch claimed that a Saudi man, Abdullah al-Huwaiti, could face execution for an alleged murder and robbery he committed when he was 14 years old. Disregarding the 2020 ruling abolishing the death penalty for juveniles, al-Huwaiti faces execution following an unfair trial.

On 15 June 2021, the Ministry of Interior of Saudi Arabia announced that it executed Mustafa Hashem al-Darwish (26), who was allegedly charged for forming a terror cell and trying to carry out an armed revolt at the age of 17. He was detained since May 2015 for participating in anti-government protests. For years, he was placed in solitary confinement and was brutally beaten several times. During the trial, Al-Darwish told the court that he was tortured to confess the charges against them. Despite all the facts, he was sentenced to death and was ultimately beheaded. On 8 June 2021, Amnesty International had urged the Saudi authorities to “immediately halt all plans to execute Mustafa al-Darwish”, stating that the “death penalty is an abhorrent violation of the right to life in all circumstances”.

On 15 December 2013, another Saudi citizen, Aqil Al-Fararj, was arrested due to a discrepancy in the chassis number of the vehicle he was driving. After his arrest, several charges were brought against him, including participation in the formation of a terrorist cell affiliated with a secret armed organization that aims at armed revolt against the ruler, destabilizing internal security, killing security men, concealing arms, and drug dealing.  On 1 June 2021, the Court of Appeal ratified the Taazir death sentence issued against him, which means that only the approval of the Supreme Court and the signature of the King before execution remained.

Extrajudicial executions

Saudi Arabia does not tolerate dissidents and it can impose penalties on such people. Saudi Arabia is also responsible for extrajudicially killing Saudi-American journalist, Jamal Khashoggi in 2018. As he entered a Saudi consulate in Turkey, a group of Saudi assassins arrived in Turkey. He never made it out of the consulate.

See also

 Crime in Saudi Arabia
 Law of Saudi Arabia

References

Sources 
 Mackey, Sandra. The Saudis: Inside the Desert Kingdom. Updated Edition. Norton Paperback. W.W. Norton and Company, New York. 2002 (first edition: 1987).  pbk.

Citations

External links

 
Saudi Arabia
Murder in Saudi Arabia
Law of Saudi Arabia
Human rights abuses in Saudi Arabia
Controversies in Saudi Arabia